"You Are Everything" is a soul song written by Thom Bell and Linda Creed and originally recorded by the Philadelphia soul group The Stylistics.

The Stylistics version
An R&B ballad, it was the sixth track from their 1971 debut self-titled album  and was released as a single in 1971 and reached number 9 on the U.S. Billboard Hot 100 chart. It also climbed to number 10 in the Billboard R&B chart and reached number 24 in the Billboard Easy Listening chart. The Stylistics' record sold over one million copies globally, earning the band a gold disc The award was presented by the RIAA on January 3, 1972. It was the band's first gold disc.

Group member Airrion Love only sang the opening harmony part with
Russell.

The actual background vocals were done by Russell,
producer Thom Bell, Carl Helm,
Bunny Sigler,
Kenny Gamble, and
Phil Hurtt.

The rest of the Stylistics never sang on the first three albums that Thom Bell produced, as Russell explained in several interviews.

The song was used in two episodes of the TV series The Wonder Years, entitled "Denial" and "Double Double Date". It was also used in a 2002 episode of The King of Queens, called "Business Affairs". The song was featured at a dance in the 2005 comedy, The Ringer.

Marvin Gaye and Diana Ross version

Another version of the song was recorded by one-time Motown singing duo,  Diana Ross & Marvin Gaye. Released as the second UK single from their Diana & Marvin album, the song reached #5 in the UK Singles Chart in April 1974, and also became the first official Motown single to be awarded with silver disc for sales in excess of 250,000 copies. It also reached #13 on the Dutch charts and #20 on the Irish Singles Chart. It was never released as a single in the U.S.

Certifications

Notable cover versions
Many artists have covered the song. Among the most widely known are:
 In 1973, the Pearls, a 1970s vocal girl duo from Liverpool, were the first artists to chart with this song in the UK, early that year. It was released on the Bell label and reached number 41 on the UK Singles Chart.
 In 1995, English singers Melanie Williams and Joe Roberts scored a UK top 40 hit with their version of the track, which peaked at number 28.
 In 2005, Vanessa L. Williams performed the song on her covers album titled Everlasting Love. Her version was a hit on the smooth jazz, dance and Adult Contemporary charts.

References

External links
 

1970s ballads
1971 singles
1974 singles
The Stylistics songs
Diana Ross songs
Marvin Gaye songs
Maxine Nightingale songs
Roberta Flack songs
Melanie Williams songs
Vanessa Williams songs
The Pearls songs
Soul ballads
Male–female vocal duets
Songs written by Thom Bell
Songs written by Linda Creed
1971 songs
Avco Records singles
Song recordings produced by Hal Davis